Alejandro Ariel Sánchez Gallardo (born 21 March 2001), commonly known as Jandro, is a Spanish footballer who plays as a midfielder for Horta, on loan from Girona FC B.

Club career
Born in Tordera, Barcelona, Catalonia, Jandro represented CF Tordera and Girona FC as a youth, and was promoted to the reserves in Tercera División ahead of the 2020–21 campaign. He made his senior debut on 18 October 2020, coming on as a late substitute in a 3–0 away win against UE Figueres.

Jandro made his first team debut on 4 November 2020, replacing goalscorer Mamadou Sylla late into a 2–2 Segunda División away draw against Real Zaragoza. On 1 February 2021, he was loaned to UA Horta for the remainder of the 2020-21 season.

References

External links

2001 births
Living people
People from Maresme
Sportspeople from the Province of Barcelona
Spanish footballers
Footballers from Catalonia
Association football midfielders
Segunda División players
Tercera División players
Girona FC B players
Girona FC players